Francesco I Sforza  (23 July 1401 – 8 March 1466) was an Italian condottiero who founded the Sforza dynasty in the duchy of Milan, ruling as its (fourth) duke from 1450 until his death. In the 1420s, he participated in the War of L'Aquila and in the 1430s fought for the Papal States and Milan against Venice. Once war between Milan and Venice ended in 1441 under mediation by Sforza, he successfully invaded southern Italy alongside René of Anjou, pretender to the throne of Naples, and after that returned to Milan. He was instrumental in the Treaty of Lodi (1454) which ensured peace in the Italian realms for a time by ensuring a strategic balance of power. He died in 1466 and was succeeded as duke by his son, Galeazzo Maria Sforza. While Sforza was recognized as duke of Milan, his son Ludovico would be the first to have formal investiture under the Holy Roman Empire by Maximilian I in 1494.

Biography

Early life
Francesco Sforza was born in San Miniato, Tuscany, one of the seven illegitimate sons of the condottiero Muzio Sforza and Lucia da Torsano. He was the brother of Alessandro Sforza. He spent his childhood in Tricarico (in the modern Basilicata), the marquisate of which he was granted in 1412 by King Ladislaus of Naples. In 1418, he married Polissena Ruffo, a Calabrese noblewoman.

From 1419, he fought alongside his father, soon gaining fame for being able to bend metal bars with his bare hands. He later proved himself to be an expert tactician and a very skilled field commander. After the death of his father during the War of L'Aquila, he participated in Braccio da Montone's final defeat in that campaign; he fought subsequently for the Neapolitan army and then for Pope Martin V and the Duke of Milan, Filippo Maria Visconti. After some successes, he fell in disgrace and was sent to the castle of Mortara as a prisoner de facto. He regained his status after leading an expedition against Lucca.

In 1431, after fighting again for the Papal States, he led the Milanese army against Venice; the following year the duke's daughter, Bianca Maria, was betrothed to him. Despite these moves, the wary Filippo Maria never ceased to be distrustful of Sforza. The allegiance of mercenary leaders was dependent, of course, on pay; in 1433–1435, Sforza led the Milanese attack on the Papal States, but when he conquered Ancona, in Marche, he changed sides, obtaining the title of vicar of the city directly from Pope Eugene IV. In 1436–39, he served variously both in Florence and Venice.

In 1440, his fiefs in the Kingdom of Naples were occupied by King Alfonso I, and, to recover the situation, Sforza reconciled himself with Filippo Visconti. On 25 October 1441, in Cremona, he could finally marry Bianca Maria as part of the agreements that ended the war between Milan and Venice. The following year, he allied with René of Anjou, pretender to the throne of Naples, and marched against southern Italy. After some initial setbacks, he defeated the Neapolitan commander Niccolò Piccinino, who had invaded his possessions in Romagna and Marche, through the help of Sigismondo Pandolfo Malatesta (who had married his daughter Polissena) and the Venetians, and could return to Milan.

Sforza later found himself warring against Francesco Piccinino (whom he defeated at the Battle of Montolmo in 1444) and, later, the alliance of Visconti, Eugene IV, and Malatesta, who had allegedly murdered Polissena. With the help of Venice, Sforza was again victorious and, in exchange for abandoning the Venetians, received the title of capitano generale (commander-in-chief) of the Duchy of Milan's armies.

Duke of Milan
After Filippo Maria Visconti, duke of Milan, died without a male heir in 1447, fighting broke out to restore the so-called Ambrosian Republic. The name Ambrosian Republic takes its name from St. Ambrose, the patron saint of Milan. Agnese del Maino, his wife's mother, convinced the condottiero who held Pavia to restore it to him.

He also received the seigniory of other cities of the duchy, including Lodi, and started to carefully plan the conquest of the ephemeral republic, allying with William VIII of Montferrat and (again) Venice. In 1450, after years of famine, riots raged in the streets of Milan and the city's senate decided to entrust to him the duchy. Sforza entered the city as duke on 26 February.  It was the first time that such a title was handed over by a lay institution. While the other Italian states gradually recognized Sforza as the legitimate Duke of Milan, he was never able to obtain official investiture from the Holy Roman Emperor. That did not come to the Sforza Dukes until 1494, when Emperor Maximilian formally invested Francesco's son, Ludovico, as duke of Milan.

Under his rule (which was moderate and skillful), Sforza modernised the city and duchy. He created an efficient system of taxation that generated enormous revenues for the government, his court became a center of Renaissance learning and culture, and the people of Milan grew to love him. In Milan, he founded the Ospedale Maggiore, restored the Palazzo ducale, and had the Naviglio d'Adda, a channel connecting with the Adda River, built.

During Sforza's reign, Florence was under the command of Cosimo de' Medici and the two rulers became close friends. This friendship eventually manifested in first the Peace of Lodi and then the Italian League, a multi-polar defensive alliance of Italian states that succeeded in stabilising almost all of Italy for its duration. After the peace, Sforza renounced part of the conquests in eastern Lombardy obtained by his condottieri Bartolomeo Colleoni, Ludovico Gonzaga, and Roberto Sanseverino d'Aragona after 1451. As King Alfonso I of Naples was among the signatories of the treaty, Sforza also abandoned his long support of the Angevin pretenders to Naples. He also aimed to conquer Genoa, then an Angevin possession; when a revolt broke out there in 1461, he had Spinetta Campofregoso elected as Doge, as his puppet. Sforza occupied Genoa and Savona in 1464.

Sforza was the first European ruler to follow a foreign policy based on the concept of the balance of power, and the first native Italian ruler to conduct extensive diplomacy outside the peninsula to counter the power of threatening states such as France. Sforza's policies succeeded in keeping foreign powers from dominating Italian politics for the rest of the century.

Edward IV of England sought to strengthen friendly relations with Sforza and accordingly offered him membership of the prestigious Order of the Garter. He accepted and became a knight of the Garter in 1463.

Sforza suffered from hydropsy and gout. In 1462, rumours spread that he was dead and a riot exploded in Milan. He however survived for four more years, finally dying in March 1466. He was succeeded as duke by his son, Galeazzo Maria Sforza.

Francesco's successor Ludovico commissioned Leonardo da Vinci to design an equestrian statue as part of a monument to Francesco I Sforza. A clay model of a horse which was to be used as part of the design was completed by Leonardo in 1492 — but the statue was never built. In 1999 the horse alone was cast from Leonardo's original designs in bronze and placed in Milan outside the racetrack of Ippodromo del Galoppo.

Issue
Francesco Sforza with his second wife Bianca Maria Visconti had:
 Galeazzo Maria (24 January 1444 — 26 December 1476), Duke of Milan from 1466 to 1476.
 Ippolita Maria (18 April 1446 — 20 August 1484), wife of Alfonso II of Naples and mother of Isabella of Aragon, who was to marry Galeazzo's heir.
 Filippo Maria (12 December 1449 — 1492), Count of Corsica.
 Sforza Maria (18 August 1451 — 29 July 1479), Duke of Bari from 1464 to 1479.
 Francesco Galeazzo Maria (5 August 1453/54 — died young).
 Ludovico Maria (3 August 1452 — 27 May 1508), Duke of Bari from 1479 to 1494 and Duke of Milan from 1494 to 1499.
 Ascanio Maria (3 March 1455 — 28 May 1505), Abbot of Chiaraville, Bishop of Pavia, Cremona, Pesaro, and Novara and Cardinal.
 Elisabetta Maria (10 June 1456 — 1473), wife of Guglielmo VIII Paleologo, Margrave of Montferrat.
 Ottaviano Maria (30 April 1458 — 1477), Count of Lugano, who drowned while escaping arrest.

Francesco Sforza also had an unspecified number (possibly 35) of illegitimate children.
Giovanna d'Acquapendente, who was Francesco's official lover between the death of his first wife and his marriage to Bianca Maria Visconti, gave him 7 children including:
Sforza Secondo Sforza (1433–1492 or 1493), count of Borgonuovo;
Drusiana Sforza  (30 September 1437 - 29 June 1474), married  Jacopo Piccinino.

References

Sources

 

 

 

 

 
 

1401 births
1466 deaths
Burials at Milan Cathedral
15th-century condottieri
Francesco 1
Francesco 1
Knights of the Garter
People from the Province of Pisa
Republic of Venice generals